James Ratti (born 14 October 1997) is a Welsh rugby union player who plays for the Cardiff Rugby as a lock and blindside flanker.

Ratti made his debut for the Ospreys in 2018 against Zebre having previously played for the Ospreys academy and Aberavon RFC. Ratti was released from the Ospreys following the 2018-2019 Pro14 season. He was subsequently picked up by Cardiff RFC on a professional contract allowing him to train full time with the Cardiff.

International career
He was called up to the senior Wales squad for the 2022 Six Nations Championship.

References

External links 
Ospreys Player Profile

Welsh rugby union players
Rugby union locks
Ospreys (rugby union) players
Living people
1997 births
Cardiff Rugby players